Mark Washington (born April 16, 1973) is the defensive coordinator for the Hamilton Tiger-Cats of the Canadian Football League (CFL). He is also a retired professional Canadian football defensive back in the CFL, having played for the Montreal Alouettes and the BC Lions over 11 seasons. After his retirement, he joined the Lions as the defensive backs coach, and was promoted to defensive coordinator for the 2014 BC Lions season.

College career
Washington attended Rutgers University. As a junior at Rutgers, he was an All-Big East performer, and as a senior, he was the team captain.

Professional career
Washington began his pro career with the Barcelona Dragons of NFL Europa, where he won a World Bowl in 1997. He played six seasons for the Montreal Alouettes, from 1997 to 2002, recording nine interceptions (and returning two for touchdowns) and winning a Grey Cup in 2002. He moved in 2003, as a free agent, to the BC Lions, where in five seasons he intercepted eight passes (one for a TD), was named an all-star in 2003, and won the Grey Cup in 2006. He retired on January 31, 2008.

Coaching and broadcasting
After his playing career, he became the defensive backs coach of the BC Lions, and also began a career in television broadcasting, co-hosting a local talk-show.
On December 12, 2013 it was announced that he would become the new defensive coordinator for the BC Lions.

Mark Washington was named defensive coordinator and defensive backs coach for the Hamilton Tiger-Cats on January 16, 2019. On November 29, 2022, it was reported by TSN insider Farhan Lalji that Washington was one of three finalists for the vacant Ottawa Redblacks head coaching job.

References

1973 births
Living people
American players of Canadian football
Canadian football defensive backs
Canadian television hosts
BC Lions coaches
BC Lions players
Hamilton Tiger-Cats coaches
Montreal Alouettes players
Barcelona Dragons players
New York CityHawks players
Rutgers Scarlet Knights football players
People from Temple Hills, Maryland